Queluz may refer to:

Portugal
Queluz, Portugal, a city in the municipality of Sintra, Portugal
Queluz (Sintra), one of the civil parishes in the city of Queluz
The Queluz National Palace, located in the city

Brazil 
Queluz, São Paulo, a municipality in the state of São Paulo, Brazil
Conselheiro Lafaiete, a municipality in the state of Minas Gerais, Brazil, previously known as Queluz